Neournula is a genus of fungi in the family Chorioactidaceae. There are two species in the genus, found in the US, Europe, and northern Africa. Spore examination may be necessary to distinguish the species from those of the genus Urnula.

References

External links
Neournula at Index Fungorum

Pezizales
Pezizales genera